Baseball in Greece is regulated by the Hellenic Amateur Baseball Federation (HABF), which was founded in 1997. HABF overseas represented one league known as the Greek Baseball league. Greece is represented in international play by the Greek National Baseball Team. 56-game regular season.

History

HABF was founded in 1997 preparation for the hosting of the 2004 Summer Olympics in Athens. The goal was "creating and eventually fielding a Greek Olympic Baseball Team for the Athens 2004 Olympic Games."  The leagues' inaugural season was in 2000, with Marousi 2004 from Athens winning the Greek Baseball league title that year. The inaugural Greek Cup was also held in 2000 and was won by another Athenian team, Spartakos Glyfadas. HABF currently has about 20 men's amateur teams playing in two stadiums and a number of practice fields. U.S. and Greek players compete in the league.

Peter Angelos, the Greek-American owner of the Baltimore Orioles, helped finance a Greek national team for the 2004 Olympics.

By 2008, HABF realized there would be no more government funding for baseball. The Federation was able to continue but with fewer teams. Through the work of the HABF and personal funds from its President, they sent a team to the 2008 European Qualifier's Championship in Portugal.  They won all their games.

International Competitions
2002 – 1st place in the European B’ Pool Championship
2003 – 2nd place in the European Senior's Championship
2004 – 7th place in the Athens Olympic Games
2005 – 9th place in the European Senior's Championship
2005 – (Although the team had qualified for the World Cup, no government funding forced the team to withdraw)
2007 – (Although the team had qualified for the European Senior's Championship, Greece was forced to withdraw)
2008 – 1st place in the European B’ Pool Qualification Tournament
2010 – 4th place in the European Senior's Championship
2011 – 15th place in the World Cup
2012 – 7th place in the European Senior's Championship
2014 – 10th place in the European Senior's Championship

Current 2018 roster

Current league structure
A DIVISION - ACTIVE TEAMS
 Aris Baseball Club (Thessaloniki)
 Milonas Neas Smyrnis (Smyrna)
 Eyriali Glyfadas (Athens)
 Dias Patron (Patron)
 Olympiada Peristeriou (Athens)
 Panathinaikos A.O. (Athens)
 Marousi 2004 (Marousi)
 Leaders Vouliagmenis(Vouliagmeni)
 AEL Baseball
(Larissa)
NON RECENT ACTIVITY TEAMS
Zeus Kalamarias (Thessaloniki)
A.O. Seirios Paralias (Patras)
Thiseas Patron (Patras)
Galini (Patras)
Filathlitiki Lesxi Aigiou (Aigio)
A.O. Leontes Peiraios (Athens)
Titanes Olympismou (Athens)
Pelopas Patron (Patras)
Ainos Kefalonias (Kefalonia)
Olympiada Peristeriou (Athens)
Spartakos Glyfadas (Athens)
Panthers Patras (Patras)
A.O.N.S Milon (Athens)

See also
Baseball awards#Greece
Baseball awards#Europe

References

External links
 Baseball in Greece (in Greek)
 Greece Baseball. InternationalBaseball.org